The 1931–32 season was the 40th season of The Football League.

Final league tables
The tables and results below are reproduced here in the exact form that they can be found at The Rec.Sport.Soccer Statistics Foundation website and in Rothmans Book of Football League Records 1888–89 to 1978–79, with home and away statistics separated.

Beginning with the season 1894–95, clubs finishing level on points were separated according to goal average (goals scored divided by goals conceded), or more properly put, goal ratio. In case one or more teams had the same goal average, this system favoured those teams who had conceded fewer goals. The goal average system was eventually scrapped beginning with the 1976–77 season. From the 1922–23 season on re-election was required of the bottom two teams of both Third Division North and Third Division South.

First Division

Results

Maps

Second Division

Results

Maps

Third Division North

Results

Wigan Borough resigned mid-season and folded; their record was expunged. Their results are listed for informational purposes.

Maps

Third Division South

Results

Maps

See also
1931–32 in English football
1931 in association football
1932 in association football

References

Ian Laschke: Rothmans Book of Football League Records 1888–89 to 1978–79. Macdonald and Jane's, London & Sydney, 1980.

English Football League seasons
Eng
1931–32 in English football leagues